Samson Olasupo Adeniyi Ayokunle, CON (born January 25, 1957) commonly known as Supo Ayokunle is a Nigerian pastor and administrator. He was the 7th president of the Christian Association of Nigeria. He was also the 6th President of the Nigerian Baptist Convention.

He was born in Oyo State, Nigeria and married Deborah Ayokunle  (nee Adesipo). Until becoming a pastor, Ayokunle worked as a teacher and public administrator.

Early life
Olasupo Ayokunle was born into the family of Amos Ogunkunle and Theresa Bibilari Ogunkunle of Jagun Alawusa House, Isheke, Oyo Town in Oyo State.

Education

He attended Oniyanrin Baptist Central Day School, Iware Road, Oyo State, graduated in 1971, earning his West African School Leaving Certificate  Ordinary Level in 1977. He received his Bachelor of Science in Sociology from the University of Ibadan in 1983. He enrolled for a Post Graduate Diploma in Education in 1986. Ayokunle holds master's of divinity degree in Theology in 1992 at the Nigerian Baptist Theological Seminary, Ogbomoso, master's degree in Guidance and Counselling from University of Ibadan, Master's degree in Theology and Religious studies, Liverpool Hope University, Liverpool in 2000 and 2003 respectively and Doctor of Philosophy (Ph.D) degree in Theology in 2008.

Nigerian Baptist Convention
Ayokunle was elected the 6th Nigerian General Secretary (now President/CEO) of the Nigerian Baptist Convention.

Christian Association of Nigeria
In 2016 he was made President of the Christian Association of Nigeria (CAN], the largest Christian ecumenical body in Africa, after Pastor Ayo Oritsejafor left office. He was re-elected in 2019 for another term.

Publications

Books
 Major Keys to a Successful Christian marriage and the Family. Day Star Press, 1997
 Weapons for Winning your Battles. Ibadan: Baptist Press, 1998
 Fighting to Win. Glad Tidings Publishers, Ibadan: Glad Tidings Publishers, 1999
 ‘The Role of the Preacher in Minimizing the use of Religion for Violence’ in Ecclesiastes: The Preacher, the Church and the Contemporary Society ed. by Ademola Ishola and Deji  Ayegboyin. Ibadan: Baptist Press, 2006
 Effective Christian Leadership in the 21st Century, ed. Ibadan: Baptist Press, 2010
 Building a Witnessing Family. Lagos: Dunamis Windows Resource, 2012
 ‘The Minister’s Family: A Glorious Example’ in The Minister and his Family (A Resource Book for The Life Builders’ Conference, 2009
 Church Communication and Conflict Management for Strategic Church Leaders, 2014
 Integrity: Key to Success in Leadership,2015

Articles 
Ayokunle has written several articles for the Nigerian Baptist Magazine, the monthly publication of the Nigerian Baptist Convention.

 ‘The Secret Life of a Vessel that Liberates’ in Kingdom Leaders: Vessels of Liberation. (A resource book for the Nigerian Baptist Convention’s General Workers’ Conference held at Bowen University, Iwo from February 1–3, 2010), pp. 1–14
 ‘The Minister and the Spiritual Mandate’ in The Minister and Spiritual Gifts. (Resource Book for the Ministers’ Conference, 2010, Baptist College of Theology, Oyo), pp. 25–31
 ‘Leadership Pitfalls: Preventing the Killer Diseases’ in Effective Christian Leadership in the 21st Century’ ed. by Rev. Dr. Supo Ayokunle. Ibadan: Baptist Press, 2010, pp. 37–50

Award 
In October 2022, a Nigerian national honour of Commander of the Order of the Niger (CON) was conferred on him by President Muhammadu Buhari.

References

1957 births
Nigerian religious leaders
21st-century Nigerian writers
21st-century Nigerian educators
Living people